John Bradford is an American soccer coach who currently serves as the head coach of USL League One club North Carolina FC.

Playing career
Bradford played college soccer at Furman University between 1998 and 2001.

In July 2020, aged 40 years old, Bradford signed his first professional contract for North Carolina FC due to an injury crisis.

Coaching career
After college, Bradford was invited to be an assistant coach with Dallas Texans Soccer Club, where he stayed in the role for three years.

North Carolina FC
Bradford returned to North Carolina to work with the Capital Area Soccer League, now known as North Carolina FC Youth. Following fourteen years working as an assistant coach and academy director for the club, he was eventually handed the head coach role in January 2021, taking charge of the USL League One side. On June 9, 2022, Bradford was named USL League One Coach of the Month for May 2022. On June 15, 2022, North Carolina announced Bradford had signed a multi-year contract extension.

References

Living people
1980 births
American soccer coaches
American soccer players
Soccer players from North Carolina
Furman Paladins men's soccer players
North Carolina FC players
United States men's youth international soccer players
USL League One coaches
Association footballers not categorized by position
Sportspeople from Winston-Salem, North Carolina
North Carolina FC coaches
Texas–Permian Basin Falcons
College men's soccer coaches in the United States